Tylopaedia is a butterfly genus in the family Lycaenidae. It is monotypic containing only the species Tylopaedia sardonyx, the king copper, which is found in South Africa and Namibia.

The wingspan is 32–40 mm for males and 35–50 mm females. Adults are on wing from August to December and from January to April in two generations per year.

The larvae feed on Aspalathus spinosa, Phylica olaefolia, and Euclea undulata.

Subspecies
Tylopaedia sardonyx sardonyx (eastern Western Cape to Namaqualand and near Karuman in the Northern Cape, north into Botswana, east to the Eastern Cape and the Free State)
Tylopaedia sardonyx peringueyi (Dickson, 1969) (Western Cape)
Tylopaedia sardonyx cerita Henning & Henning, 1998 (central Namibia)

References

Aphnaeinae
Monotypic butterfly genera
Lycaenidae genera